Ludhiana is the most populous and the largest city in the Indian state of Punjab. It is a major industrial center of Northern India, referred to as "India's Manchester" by the BBC.

It stands on the old bank of Sutlej River, that is now  to the south of its present course. The Union Ministry of Housing and Urban Affairs has placed Ludhiana on the 48th position among the top 100 smart cities and has been ranked as one of the easiest city in India for business according to the World Bank.

History
Ludhiana was founded in 1480 by members of the ruling Lodhi dynasty of the Delhi Sultanate. The ruling sultan, Sikandar Lodhi, dispatched two ruling chiefs, Yusuf Khan and Nihad Khan, to re-assert Lodhi control. The two men camped at the site of present Ludhiana, which was then a village called Mir Hota. Yusuf Khan crossed the Sutlej and established Sultanpur, while Nihad Khan founded Ludhiana on the site of Mir Hota.

The name was originally Lodhi-ana", meaning "Lodhi town", which has since shifted from "Lodiana" to the present form of Ludhiana. The Lodhi Fort, or "Purana Qila", is the only surviving structure in the city from this period; located in the neighbourhood of Fatehgarh, it was well-maintained under Ranjit Singh and the British after him, but then fell into disrepair. It was declared a state-protected monument in December 2013.

The Semi Centennial Celebration of the American Presbyterian Lodiana Mission was held in Ludhiana from 3–7 December 1884.

Ludhiana's Old City includes landmarks like the Lodhi Fort, Daresi Grounds, The Clock Tower, & Sood Family Haveli.

Geography
Ludhiana City, to its residents, consists of the Old City and the New City. The new city primarily consists of the Civil Lines area which was historically known as the residential and official quarters of the colonial British encampment.

The land dips steeply to the north and the west where, before 1785, the river Sutlej ran.

The Old Fort was at the banks of the Sutlej (and now houses the College of Textile Engineering). Legend has it that a tunnel connects it to the fort in Phillaur– although why this should be is debatable, as the Sutlej was the traditional dividing line between the principalities, often occupied by enemy forces (see History section).

The ground is of yellow sandstone and granite, forming small hillocks, plateaus and dips.

The tree of largest natural extraction was the kikar, or Acacia Indica, but has been supplanted by the eucalyptus, transplanted from rural Australia in the late 1950s by the Chief Minister Partap Singh Kairon.

Gulmohars and jacarandas were planted by the British along the avenues of Civil Lines, as were other flowering trees, while the Old City contains almost no vegetation or parks, except for a few isolated pipal trees, holy to the Hindus, as it is supposed to be the abode of Lord Shiva.

Climate
Ludhiana features a relatively dry monsoon-influenced humid subtropical climate (Cwa) under the Köppen climate classification, although bordering on a hot semi-arid climate (BSh), with three defined seasons; summer, monsoon and winter. The official weather station for the city is in the compound of the Civil Surgeon's Office to the west of Ludhiana. Weather records here date back to 1 August 1868.

Ludhiana has one of the worst air pollution problems in India since 2011, with particulate matter being over six times the World Health Organization recommended standard, making it the 13th most polluted city in the world. Industrial water pollution is also of significant concern in portions of Ludhiana, notably along the Budha Dariya.

Demographics

As per the 2011 census, Ludhiana had a population of 2,618,879. The literacy rate was 86.50 per cent, and the population consisted of 950,123 males and 743,530 females.

Religion

With around 66% adherents according to 2011 Indian Census, Hinduism is the predominant religion of Ludhiana, followed by Sikhism with 29% of the population. Islam is followed by  2.8% and Christianity by less than 1%.

Prior to India's partition, Ludhiana had a population of 111,639 with Muslims being the majority with 62.9%. The Hindus were 31.1% and Sikhs 4.7%. It changed post-partition with a drastic reduction in Muslim percentage and simultaneous increase in Hindu and Sikh population, owing to migration of people between West and East Punjab.

Language 
At the time of the 2011 census, 67.00% of the population spoke Punjabi, 29.24% Hindi and 1.35% Bhojpuri as their first language.

Administration
Ludhiana Municipal Corporation is the urban local civic body in the city.

Politics
The city is part of the Ludhiana (Lok Sabha constituency). The assembly constituencies in the city are:

Economy

The World Bank ranked Ludhiana as the city in India with the best business environment in 2009 and 2013. The riches are brought mostly by small-scale industrial units, which produce industrial goods, machine parts, auto parts, household appliances, hosiery, apparel, and garments. Ludhiana is Asia's largest hub for bicycle manufacturing and produces more than 50% of India's bicycle production each year. Ludhiana produces 60% of India's tractor parts and a large portion of auto and two-wheeler parts. Many parts used in German cars such as Mercedes and BMW are exclusively produced in Ludhiana to satisfy the world requirement. It is one of the largest manufacturer of domestic sewing machines. Hand tools and industrial equipment are other specialties. Ludhiana contribute most to Punjab than any other city.

The apparel industry of Ludhiana, popularly known as Ludhiana hosiery industry provides employment to numerous people and produces India's largest share of winter clothing. It is especially known for its woollen sweaters and cotton T-shirts with the majority of India's woollen clothing brands being based here. Ludhiana is also famous for its industry of shawls and stoles and satisfies the demand of major domestic and international brands. As a result of its dominance in the textile industry it is often dubbed as the Manchester of India. Ludhiana is know sourcing production to major Corporate Brands all over India. It is the cloths manufactured here in Ludhiana that sells in big Brand showrooms. Ludhiana also has a growing IT sector with multiple software services and product companies having development centers in the city.  In April 2021, BizMerlinHR, a HR management software firm with development center in Ludhiana was awarded Cool Vendor in HCM for 2021 by industry analyst Gartner.

Ludhiana was home to the Ludhiana Stock Exchange Association. LSE was situated on NH95 (Chandigarh-Ferozepur Highway) in Feroze Gandhi market near Mini Secretariat Ludhiana. The association is now defunct.

Attractions

Sports
Guru Nanak Stadium in Ludhiana hosts a number of sporting events including athletics, football, badminton, basketball, gymnastics, handball, kabaddi, table tennis, volleyball, as well as other indoor games.

Kabaddi
Kabaddi world cup finals have been played twice in Guru Nanak Stadium Ludhiana. The stadium often hosts high-profile Kabaddi matches.

Football
Various competitions like finals of National Games Football Matches (2001) and I-League matches of clubs like Minerva Punjab FC (now RoundGlass Punjab Football Club) have been played in Guru Nanak Stadium.

Kila Raipur Sports Festival
Kila Raipur Sports Festival, popularly known as Rural Olympics Games, is held annually in Kila Raipur, near Ludhiana. Competitions are held for rural sports, including gatka, bullock cart races, trolley races, kabaddi, loading unloading trucks and acrobatics.

Skating
A skating rink is situated in Leisure Valley, Sarabha Nagar.

Places of interest 
 Alamgir
 Doraha
 Jagraon
 Katana Sahib
 Khanna
 Kila Raipur
 Machhiwara
 Mullanpur Dakha
 Nanaksar
 Payal
 Serai Lashkari Khan
 Sidhwanbet
 Rose Garden
 Sudhar
 Sri Bhaini Sahib

Transportation
Ludhiana is well connected by road and rail as Ludhiana railway station is on the main Delhi-Amritsar route, and is an important railway junction with lines going to Jalandhar, Ferozepur, Dhuri, and Delhi. The city is very well connected with daily or weekly trains to most places in India including the major cities of Jammu, Amritsar, Jalandhar, Patiala, Pathankot, Kanpur, Jaipur, Ajmer, Chandigarh, Ambala, Panipat, Delhi, Pune, Mumbai, Indore, Bhopal, Lucknow, Ahmadabad, Nagpur, Ayodhya, Nanded, Patna, and Kolkata. For administrative reasons the station is under Ferozepur Railway Division. The railway line between Ludhiana and Chandigarh opened in 2013. The government has even passed a dedicated freight track between Ludhiana and Kolkata.

Road 
Ludhiana is connected with other cities of Punjab and also with other states by bus service. Major national highways NH 44, NH 5 (old NH1, NH95 respectively) and state highway SH 11 connect to the city. The transportation services are provided by the state owned Punjab Roadways and private bus operators.

Airport
Ludhiana is served by the city based Sahnewal Airport, also known as Ludhiana Airport. The current airport arrival/departure halls can accommodate 40 passengers. A new airport in Ludhiana is coming up at Halwara Air Force Station with work under progress.

Chandigarh Airport is the nearest International Airport to Ludhiana. Other nearby airports are Adampur Airport in Jalandhar and Sri Guru Ram Dass Jee International Airport in Amritsar.

Railway

Ludhiana Junction railway station is connected to other metro cities. It also has Sahnewal, Doraha, Kila Raipur railway stations which serve cargo and passenger trains. Vande Bharat Express has a stop at Ludhiana junction on its New Delhi (NDLS) - Shri Mata Vaishno Devi Katra (SVDK) route.

City transportation
City bus service has been cancelled. Moving around inside the city is done mostly by auto-rickshaws, and cycle rickshaws, while latest Ludhiana BRTS was planned to be constructed but due to lack of funds allotted and weak planning and management the project too has been scrapped by the government thus worsening the traffic problems in the industrial city.

Auto rickshaw

The Auto rickshaw is a three-wheel drive vehicle, which is one way to travel in the city. They have the capacity to hold three to six passengers. It can be hired individually or on a sharing basis. The auto rickshaws are easily available at every major place, including the interstate bus terminal and the railway station at a nominal fare which varies from ₨ 10 to ₨ 30. Jugnoo, an on demand auto rickshaw application launched its operations in February 2015 to provide low cost, reliable, 24×7 service to the citizens of Ludhiana.

Rickshaw
Cycle rickshaws are widely used in Ludhiana. The rickshaw or tricycle is pulled by a person and is a relatively cheap way of travelling in the city, but has become pricey after the autos have been scrapped.

Taxi
Radio taxis are also easily available. This is the most used means of transport by the people of Ludhiana. Ola Cabs launched in the city on 7 October 2014. Uber is also very popular in the city. Zoomcar provides cars for self-drive car rental in the city.

Education

Schools 
Ludhiana has 363 senior secondary, 367 high, 324 middle, 1129 primary, and pre-primary recognised Schools, with a total of 398,770 students. Most of these schools are either run by the ICSE Central Board of Secondary Education or by Punjab School Education Board.. Prominent schools in Ludhiana includes R.S. Model Senior Secondary School and Wylie Memorial High School.

Agriculture
Ludhiana is home to the largest agricultural university in Asia and one of the largest in the world, Punjab Agricultural University. The College of Veterinary Sciences at PAU was recently upgraded to the Guru Angad Dev Veterinary and Animal Sciences University (GADVASU).

GADVASU was established at Ludhiana by an act of the Punjab Legislature No. 16 of 2005 notified in the Punjab Government Gazette on 9 August 2005 and it started functioning 21 April 2006 for promoting livestock production, health and prevention of disease through integrated teaching, research and extension programmes.

Medical

Christian Medical College, Ludhiana, the first medical school for women in Asia, was founded by Dame Edith Mary Brown in 1894. Christian Medical College is a major and reputed tertiary care hospital in India, also the location of the world's first face transplant. Dayanand Medical College and Hospital is another tertiary care teaching hospital in Ludhiana. Both these institutions are recognised by the Medical Council of India. The college is affiliated to Baba Farid University of Health Sciences, Punjab.

Engineering

Guru Nanak Dev Engineering College is an institution offering facilities and education for engineering students. It has a research and development center for bicycles and sewing machines.

Ludhiana College of Engineering and Technology is an institute for Engineering and Management studies.

Notable individuals 

 J. C. Mahindra, Indian industrialist and co-founder of Mahindra & Mahindra
 K.C. Mahindra Indian industrialist who co-founded Mahindra & Mahindra
 Sukhdev Thapar, Freedom fighter
 Kartar Singh Sarabha, Freedom fighter
 Gippy Grewal, Singer, actor
 Sukh Sanghera, Film director and music video director
 Bhai Randhir Singh, Freedom fighter
 Neel Kamal Puri, novelist, columnist
 Dharmendra, actor
 Sunil Mittal, entrepreneur, founder of Airtel and Bharti Enterprises
 Simarjit Singh Bains, Social worker, politician
 Sahir Ludhianvi, lyricist
 Sukhdeep Singh Chakria, Boxer
 Divya Dutta, actress
 Manjit Rupowalia, Singer
 Rajinder Gupta, Industrialist, Chairman of TridentGroup
 Trishneet Arora, Ethical hacker, author
 Shubha Phutela, actress
 Dakssh Ajit Singh, actor
 Jainti Dass Saggar, Physician, politician
 Abhinav Shukla, actor
 Sudarshan Agarwal, politician
 Shilpi Sharma, actress
 Gulzar Singh Sandhu, writer
 Naina Dhaliwal, Indian model
 Inderjit Hasanpuri, songwriter
 Ram Singh, Social reformer
 Maulana Habib-ur-Rehman Ludhianvi, One of the founders of Majlis-e-Ahrar-e-Islam
 Barkat Ali Ludhianwi, Muslim Sufi and founder of the Dar ul Ehsan organisation
 Talish, Pakistani actor
 Raj Khosla, director
 Baldev Raj Chopra, producer and director
 Kuldeep Manak, Singer
 Inderjit Nikku, Singer
 Ravinder Grewal, Singer
 Amar Singh Chamkila, Singer
 Surinder Shinda, Singer
 Karnail Gill, Singer
 Ishmeet Singh, Singer
 Lal Chand Yamla Jatt, Singer
 Mandeep Singh, Cricketer
 Pankaj Kapoor, Actor
 Hardev Dilgir, lyricist
 Saadat Hasan Manto, writer, playwright
 Sanjeev Talwar, MLA Ludhiana East
 Bharat Bhushan Ashu, MLA Ludhiana West, Punjab Cabinet Minister
 Ish Sodhi, New Zealand Cricketer
 Happy Raikoti, lyricist, singer
 Chetan Sharma , Indian cricket player
 Yashpal Sharma, Indian cricket player
 Jaswinder Bhalla, actor in Punjabi cinema
 Anuv Jain, singer and songwriter
 Anand Arnold, bodybuilder
 Balbir Singh Rajewal, Farm union leader and politician
 Chahat Goyal, software development engineer, Amazon Web Services
 Bhavish Aggarwal, Businessman and Founder of Ola cabs and Ola electric
 Prabhsukhan Singh Gill, Footballer who plays as a goalkeeper for Kerala Blasters and India national team

See also 
 Ludhianvi

Notes

References

Bibliography
 Mahan Kosh, Bhai Kahan Singh Nabha, pp 311.
 Encyclopaedia of Sikhism, Prof. Harbans Singh vol 2 pp 416
 The Sikh Ref Book, Dr Harjinder Singh Dilgeer p464 & p196
 
 
 "Heavy metal contamination of the ecosystems by industrial emissions from Ludhiana"

External links

 Official website of District Ludhiana (Punjab)
 Everything Ludhiana (Punjab)
 Ludhiana City Smart City Web Portal

 
Smart cities in India
Metropolitan cities in India
Cities and towns in Ludhiana district
Articles containing potentially dated statements from 2010
All articles containing potentially dated statements
Populated places established in the 1480s